The Order of Military Merit is an honour awarded to members of the Military of the Dominican Republic. It was established on 15 November 1930.

Divisions and classes 
The Order is in three divisions:
Awarded for combat or war service. Displayed on a red ribbon
Awarded for long and faithful service. Displayed on a  blue ribbon
Awarded for other service. Displayed on a  white ribbon

Within each division, the award is made in one of four classes:

 First Class: to General Officers.
 Second Class: to Superior Officers.
 Third Class: to Junior Officers.
 Fourth Class: to Non-Commissioned Officers.

The motto of the order is Honour, Virtue, Valor.

Recipients 

 James Carson Breckinridge
 James T. Moore (USMC)
 Julian C. Smith
 Allen H. Turnage
 Gregon A. Williams
 William A. Worton

Post-Nominal
The person awarded with this honour should be added the post-nominal M. M. (Mérito Militar, Spanish for Militar Merit) after his or her full name, in all the official papers and documents.

References

See also
 Orders, decorations, and medals of the Dominican Republic

Militar Merit, Order of
Militar Merit, Order of
Dominican Republic–United States military relations
Banana Wars